Lost mines are a popular form of lost treasure legend.  The mines involved usually contain a high-value commodity such as gold, silver or diamonds.  Often, there is a map (sometimes called a "waybill") purportedly showing the location of the mine.  

Common reasons for the mines being lost include:
 The mine was discovered and worked by a recluse who refuses to divulge the location, and dies without revealing the location.
 The mine was worked by native peoples who refuse to divulge the location to others.
 The mineral deposit was discovered in a remote location, and upon returning to the area the discoverer could not find it again.
 The discoverer died of hunger, thirst, or exposure shortly after discovering the deposit, and his body is found with rich ore specimens in his possession.
 The discoverers were killed by hostile natives.  Sometimes the natives cover up the entrance to the mine.
 In Spanish Empire colonies in the New World, many lost mines were supposedly worked under the direction of Jesuit priests before their sudden expulsion in 1767.

Some lost mine legends have a historical basis; some have none.  But the lure of lost mine legends is attested by the many books on the subject, and the popularity of publications such as Lost Treasure magazine.

List of lost mine legends
Legends of lost mines are probably worldwide.  Those listed below are just a sampling.

Africa
 King Solomon's Mines

Australia
 Lasseter's Reef (Never actually mined)

Bolivia
 Sacambaya mine

Brazil
 Muribeca mine

Canada
 Lost Lemon Mine, Alberta
 Pitt Lake gold find, British Columbia
 Jolly Jack's Lost Mine, British Columbia
 Lost McLeod Mine, Northwest Territories
 Johanssen's Lost Platinum Cache, British Columbia
 Foster's Lost Mine, Vancouver Island
 Lost Christie Lead, British Columbia
 Lost Silver Lead of Monashee Creek, British Columbia

Colombia
 Chivor mine, an emerald mine lost for 200 years, then found again.

Mexico
 Lost diamond mine of Vicente Guerrero
 Lost Naranjal mine, Durango
 Planchas de Plata, Sonora, (sometimes called Bolas de Plata).  Periodically assumed to be "lost," although the location is well documented. 
 Tayopa silver mine, Sonora

Russia
 In the 19th century, gold fever was prevalent in the Ural region near Ekaterinburg. There are many legends of the lost mines, for example in Mamin-Sibiryak's stories.
 There are many modern stories of lost diamond mines in the Yakutia region of north and northeast Russia

United States
 Lost Padre mine, various locations in USA
 Lost Cabin mine, various locations in USA

Arizona
 Lost Dutchman's Gold Mine, Arizona
 Mine with the Iron Door, Arizona

California
 Lost Pegleg mine, California; supposedly found by mountain man "Pegleg" Smith.
 Lost Breyfogle mine, California or Nevada
 The Lost Cement Mine, California
 The Lost Dutch Oven Mine, California
 Death Valley Scotty's secret mine, California or Nevada
 Lost Gunsight mine, California or Nevada
 Lost Padre mine, southern California

Colorado
 Lost Pin, Delta County, Colorado
 Recluse Goatherder's Gold Mine, Colorado
 Three Skeletons, La Plata County, Colorado

Idaho
 The Wheelbarrow Mine, Idaho

Kentucky
 Swift's silver mine, Kentucky

Missouri
 Yocum silver mine, Stone County, Missouri

Nevada
 The Lost Sheepherders Mine, Nevada

New Mexico
 Lost Adams Diggings, New Mexico or Arizona
 Treasure of Victorio Peak, White Sands, New Mexico

Oregon
 Lost Blue Bucket Mine, Oregon
 Two Frenchmen Mine, Oregon

Texas
 Lost Nigger Gold Mine, Texas
 San Saba mine (sometimes called the Lost Bowie mine or the Lost Almagres mine), Texas

Utah
 Lost Rhoades mine, Utah
 Lost Josephine mine, Utah

Washington
 Danville's Lost Gold Ledge, Washington (state)
 Janni's chimney, Washington (state)
 Lost Doukhobor Ledge, Washington (state)

Fiction
The Agatha Christie Poirot short story "The Lost Mine" features a map revealing the location of a lost mine in Burma. The map is stolen in London, and its carrier murdered.

See also

Alicanto

References

 – Texas folklorist J. Frank Dobie collected many tales of lost mines of the American Southwest in the collection Coronado's Children.  The title refers to those who followed the legends of hidden riches, like Coronado did in the 17th century.

 
 
Lists of mines